Richarlison de Andrade (born 10 May 1997), known mononymously as Richarlison, is a Brazilian professional footballer who plays as a forward for  club Tottenham Hotspur and the Brazil national team.

He began his professional career with América Mineiro in 2015, winning promotion from the Campeonato Brasileiro Série B in his only season before transferring to Fluminense. He totalled 67 matches and 19 goals in his two years there and was named in the Team of the Season when the club finished as runners-up in the 2017 Campeonato Carioca. He then signed for Watford, and a year later Everton. He later signed for Tottenham Hotspur in 2022.

At international level, Richarlison made his senior debut for Brazil in 2018. He was a member of the team that won the 2019 Copa América, came runners-up at the 2021 Copa América and won a gold medal at the 2020 Olympic tournament, also playing at the 2022 FIFA World Cup.

Club career

América Mineiro
Richarlison de Andrade was born on 10 May 1997 in Nova Venécia, Espírito Santo. He joined América Mineiro's youth setup in December 2014, from Real Noroeste. In June 2015, he was promoted to the first team by manager Givanildo Oliveira. He had previously been close to giving up on a career in football, having been rejected by several teams and spent all his money on a 600-kilometre one-way ticket to Belo Horizonte for his trial.

Richarlison made his professional debut on 4 July 2015 in a 3–1 home win against Mogi Mirim. After entering as a late substitute for Cristiano, he scored the last goal of the match. Seventeen days later, he extended his contract until 2018.

On 21 November 2015, as América earned promotion to Campeonato Brasileiro Série A with a 1–1 home draw against Ceará, Richarlison was sent-off at the end of the match for a foul on Charles.

Fluminense
On 29 December 2015, Richarlison signed a five-year contract with Série A club Fluminense. He made his debut on 13 May 2016 in the second leg of the second round of the Copa do Brasil, contributing to all of his team's goals in a 3–3 home draw (6–3 aggregate) against Ferroviaria.

He made his league debut two days later, starting in a 1–0 away win against former club América. His first goal in the division came on 26 June, the winner in a 2–1 success against rivals Flamengo, a game in which he came on as a late substitute but was himself taken off injured.

In the 2017 Campeonato Carioca, Richarlison scored 8 goals in 12 matches and was named in the team of the season as his club finished as runner-up to Flamengo. This included one on 22 April in a 3–0 semi-final win over Vasco da Gama at the Maracanã Stadium.

In the same year, Richarlison also took part in his first continental competition, the 2017 Copa Sudamericana. He played four games in the Rio de Janeiro-based club's run to the quarter-finals, and scored in wins over Liverpool (Uruguay) and Universidad Católica (Ecuador) in the first two phases.

Watford

Richarlison completed a move to English Premier League club Watford on 8 August 2017, signing a five-year contract for a £11.2 million transfer fee. He made his debut for the club as a substitute in a 3–3 draw against Liverpool on the opening day of the 2017–18 Premier League season. In his next match, on 19 August against AFC Bournemouth, he scored his first goal for the club in a 2–0 win. He was the only player in the Watford squad to play every match of the Premier League season and scored five goals over its course.

Everton
Richarlison transferred to fellow Premier League club Everton on 24 July 2018 for a transfer fee starting at £35 million and potentially rising to £50 million, reuniting him with former Watford manager Marco Silva. In his competitive debut on 11 August, he scored twice in a 2–2 draw at Wolverhampton Wanderers. Two weeks later, he was sent off in the first half of a match of the same score away to Bournemouth for clashing heads with Adam Smith.

Due to the poor form of fellow Everton strikers, Richarlison was deployed in the centre-forward role for Everton's game against Leicester City on 6 October, scoring in the 7th minute in a 2–1 away win. Four weeks later, he scored twice in a 3–1 victory over Brighton & Hove Albion. Richarlison finished the season as Everton's joint-highest goalscorer along with Gylfi Sigurðsson on 13 Premier League goals, while both had 14 goals in all competitions. Ahead of the 2019–20 Richarlison was handed the number 7 shirt. He finished that season as the club's joint-highest goalscorer, this time sharing the honour with Dominic Calvert-Lewin on 13 Premier League goals, while both had 15 goals in all competitions.

On 3 December 2019, Richarlison signed a new five-year contract with Everton. On 20 February 2021, he scored the first goal in a 2–0 win over Liverpool at Anfield, Everton's first away win over their rivals since September 1999.

Tottenham Hotspur
On 1 July 2022, Tottenham Hotspur announced the signing of Richarlison on a contract until 2027, subject to a work permit for a fee of £50m plus £10m in potential add-ons. Richarlison gained his first assist for his new club in a 2–0 win against Nottingham Forest on 20 August. Richarlison's showboating during that match was widely discussed in the media, being criticised by the likes of Michail Antonio and Callum Wilson as "disrespectful," but praised by Neil Warnock, who encouraged Richarlison to continue entertaining fans. On 7 September, on his Champions League debut, he scored both goals in a 2–0 win over Marseille at the Tottenham Hotspur Stadium, his first goals for the club. He suffered injuries during the season and then complained publicly about not getting back into the team, prompting manager Antonio Conte to criticise him for being selfish.

International career

Richarlison was selected in the Brazil under-20 squad for the 2017 South American U-20 Championship. He made eight appearances and scored two goals in the tournament.

On 27 August 2018, he received his first call-up to the senior team by coach Tite, for friendlies against the United States and El Salvador, after Pedro withdrew injured. He made his debut against the Americans on 7 September at the MetLife Stadium in New Jersey, as a 75th-minute substitute for Roberto Firmino in a 2–0 win, and scored his first goals in the latter match four days later, netting twice in a 5–0 win.

In May 2019, he was included in Brazil's 23-man squad for the 2019 Copa América on home soil. In the final against Peru on 7 July, at the Maracanã Stadium, Richarlison came off the bench for Firmino in the second half and scored the final goal of a 3–1 victory from the penalty spot.

On 9 June 2021, Richarlison was named in the squad for the 2021 Copa América. He scored in a 4–0 group win over Peru as the team finished as runners-up. During the tournament, he also received a call-up for the 2020 Summer Olympics. He scored a hat-trick on his Olympics debut on 22 July, leading Brazil to a 4–2 victory over Germany. He finished the Olympics as top scorer with five goals, despite missing a penalty in the 2–1 final win over Spain.

Richarlison was named in the Brazil squad for the 2022 FIFA World Cup in Qatar. On 24 November he scored a brace, including a scissor kick, in a 2–0 opening win over Serbia. He scored his third goal of the tournament in a 4–1 win against South Korea in the round of 16 on 5 December. Four days later, Brazil were eliminated by Croatia in the quarter-finals, following a 4–2 penalty shoot-out loss after a 1–1 draw.

Personal life
Richarlison donates 10% of his salary to the Instituto Padre Roberto Lettieri, a home for cancer patients in Barretos, São Paulo state, and also supports 100 families in his hometown. In November 2021, he called for his fellow professional footballers to take COVID-19 vaccines and ignore misinformation on the topic, citing the death of his first coach Sebastião José da Silva. Though he did not endorse any candidate or party in the 2022 Brazilian general election, he spoke out on social justice issues such as the environment, police violence and human rights.

Career statistics

Club

International

Brazil score listed first, score column indicates score after each Richarlison goal.

Honours
Brazil U23
Summer Olympics: 2020

Brazil
Copa América: 2019

Individual
Campeonato Carioca Team of the Year: 2017
FIFA World Cup Goal of the Tournament: 2022
Summer Olympics Top scorer: 2020
Everton Player of the Season: 2019–20
Everton Young Player of the Season: 2018–19

 Everton Goal of the Season: 2020–21 (vs. Liverpool, 20 February 2021)

References

External links

Profile at the Tottenham Hotspur F.C. website

1997 births
Living people
People from Nova Venécia
Sportspeople from Espírito Santo
Brazilian footballers
Association football forwards
América Futebol Clube (MG) players
Fluminense FC players
Watford F.C. players
Everton F.C. players
Tottenham Hotspur F.C. players
Campeonato Brasileiro Série B players
Campeonato Brasileiro Série A players
Premier League players
Brazil under-20 international footballers
Brazil international footballers
2019 Copa América players
2021 Copa América players
2022 FIFA World Cup players
Copa América-winning players
Olympic footballers of Brazil
Footballers at the 2020 Summer Olympics
Olympic medalists in football
Olympic gold medalists for Brazil
Medalists at the 2020 Summer Olympics
Brazilian expatriate footballers
Expatriate footballers in England
Brazilian expatriate sportspeople in England